Contemporary paganism, including Wicca in various forms, Reclaiming (Neopaganism), and witchcraft, is a growing minority religious group in Australia. As in forms on Neopaganism elsewhere, some pagans work as solitary practitioners and others form groups such as covens. Covens may or not be hierarchical, depending on the tradition. Gardnerian and Alexandrian covens tend to be hierarchical, with coven led by a Priest and High Priestess. Reclaiming covens and working groups practise non-hierarchical modes of group dynamics, with group members co-creating rituals and events, although there may be 'facilitators' and other roles allotted at a given gathering.

Ceremonial magicians of various traditions are also a growing group within Australian alternative religion, however, they generally do not identify as 'pagan'. Nevertheless, there is considerable crossover between the interests of, and membership in, pagan and magical groups.

History 
Alexandrian Wiccans and Gardnerian Wiccans arrived in Australia from England and the United States around the late 1960s.

Demographics 
In June 2003, Nature Religions, including Druidism, paganism, pantheism and Wicca, were described by Phillip Hughes and Sharon Bond as “the fastest-growing group of religions in Australia” between 1991 and 2001. In 2018, paganism and Wicca were also described as among the "least urbanised religions in Australia".

In the 1991 census by the Australian Bureau of Statistics, 4,353 Australians identified their religion as a pagan religion including, 1,367 Australians who identified their religion as Wicca or Witchcraft.

In the 1996 census, 10,052 Australians identified their religion as a pagan religion, including 1,849 people who identified their religion as Wicca or Witchcraft.

In the 2001 census, 24,156 people described themselves as Pagan, including 8,755 people who identified their religion as Wicca or Witchcraft.

The PAGANdash campaign was started to help the government and community get a correct representation of the number of pagans currently in Australia.  Originating from the Pagan Community Projects in Queensland in 2005, the Pagan Awareness Network (PAN) also ran a comprehensive PAGANdash program prior to the 2011 census in Australia. All pagans were asked to fill in their religion as Pagan-(religion), for example a Wiccan would write Pagan-Wiccan as their religion.

In the 2006 census, 29,391 Australians identified their religion as a pagan religion, including 8,207 people who identified their religion as Wicca or Witchcraft.

In the 2011 census, 32,083 Australians identified their religion as a pagan religion, including 8,413 people who identified their religion as Wicca or Witchcraft.

In the 2016 census, 27,194 Australians identified their religion as a pagan religion, including 6,616 people who identified their religion as Wicca or Witchcraft. The largest affiliation of nature religions were 'Pagan' (15,219; 66% female). 'Wiccan' (6,616; 79% female) and 'Nature Religions not elsewhere classified' (3,075; 65% male); the largest affiliation by age, were 'Nature Religions not elsewhere classified' (25–29 years), 'Nature Religions, not further defined' (40–44 years), 'Pagan' (40–44 years), 'Wiccan' (45–49 years), 'Animism' (50–54 years) and 'Druidism' (50–59 years).

See also 
 Witchcraft and Paganism in Australia (book)
 Religion in Australia

References

Further reading
 
 Caroline Tully. ‘The Sabbats.’ In Practising the Witch's Craft. Ed. Douglas Ezzy. 169–188. Crows Nest NSW: Allen and Unwin, 2003.
 

 
Religion in Australia
Australia